The Nuevo Estadio Azul is a planned stadium in Mexico City, intended to replace the Estadio Azul, the former home of football club Cruz Azul.

History
The building that would replace the present Blue Stage exists on paper, though it has yet to be started. It will have four levels of underground parking, (first to be constructed), and two levels for commercial enterprises, besides a ceiling that would cover the divided launching slips high and general generally low.

There are to be three levels of theater boxes. This first draft constitutes the idea of the new home of Cruz Azul, that not only would lodge to La Maquina in its encounter like the premises, but also would be available for concerts and spectacles of all type. Recently, the president of Cruz Azul, Guillermo Alvarez Cuevas, said that the project may yet begin in 2012, once problems, like delegation permissions and negotiations with zone neighbors, are solved. One solution would be for the Cosío family, which owns the present building, to turn over ownership to Cruz Azul, while the former would use the levels destined for commercial enterprises.

However, before work begins, several issues need to be resolved. First, the pertinent permissions of the Delegation Benito Juárez and the Secretary of Urban Development and House of Mexico City must be obtained, as they will soon sign an agreement with the Cosío company. In addition, this project needs to be elaborated upon, as it has a projected cost of $2 million. Furthermore, Cruz Azul must specify what role they will play during construction. All this must be approved by President Guillermo Alvarez Cuevas and the General Assembly of the Cruz Azul Cooperative.

See also 
 Estadio Chivas
 Estadio de Fútbol Monterrey
 Estadio Nuevo Corona
 Estadio Caliente
 Arena Indios

References

External links
 Cruz Azul official website

Proposed stadiums
Football venues in Mexico
Sports venues in Mexico City
Proposed buildings and structures in Mexico